John Melin (18 May 1895 – 6 April 1966) was a Swedish film actor. He appeared in more than 90 films between 1919 and 1964.

Selected filmography

 The Ghost Baron (1927)
 The Queen of Pellagonia (1927)
 Sealed Lips (1927)
 The Devil and the Smalander (1927)
 Sin (1928)
 Frida's Songs (1930)
 Colourful Pages (1931)
 Ship Ahoy! (1931)
 Love and Deficit (1932)
 Jolly Musicians (1932)
 Saturday Nights (1933)
 Secret Svensson (1933)
 Fired (1934)
 The Atlantic Adventure (1934)
 The People of Högbogården (1939)
 Wanted (1939)
 Poor Ferdinand (1941)
 She Thought It Was Him (1943)
 In Darkest Smaland (1943)
 Crisis (1946)
 The People of Simlang Valley (1947)
 Loffe as a Millionaire (1948)
 Woman in White (1949)
 Dangerous Spring (1949)
 The Kiss on the Cruise (1950)
 The Saucepan Journey (1950)
 Knockout at the Breakfast Club (1950)
 The Motor Cavaliers (1950)
 The Quartet That Split Up (1950)
 A Ghost on Holiday (1951)
 Drömsemester (1952)
 The Clang of the Pick (1952)
 Say It with Flowers (1952)
 The Road to Klockrike (1953)
 Sju svarta be-hå (1954)
 Salka Valka (1954)
 Storm Over Tjurö (1954)
 Enchanted Walk (1954)
 Simon the Sinner (1954)
 Far och flyg (1955)
 The Summer Wind Blows (1955)
 The People of Hemsö (1955)
 A Little Nest (1956)
Seventh Heaven (1956)
 The Girl in Tails (1956)
 Synnöve Solbakken (1957)
 Never in Your Life (1957)
 The Great Amateur (1958)
 The Lady in Black (1958)
 Rider in Blue (1959)
 Lovely Is the Summer Night (1961)
 Äktenskapsbrottaren (1964)

References

External links

1895 births
1966 deaths
People from Karlskoga Municipality
People from Värmland
Swedish male film actors
Swedish male silent film actors
20th-century Swedish male actors